Top Katz is the second studio album released by British duo PJ & Duncan, now better known as Ant & Dec. The album was recorded during 1994 and 1995, and included the duo's cover of The Monkees song, Stepping Stone. The album was released in November 1995, peaking at number 46 on the UK Albums Chart, and being certified Gold in the UK by the BPI.

Background
Following the moderate success of their debut studio album, Psyche, the duo returned to the studio, and were hooked up with songwriter and producer Ray Hedges, who had success the previous year, having produced the majority of Boyzone's debut album. For the first time, McPartlin and Donnelly turned their hand to songwriting, and co-wrote the majority of the album, with the exception of their cover of The Monkees' "Stepping Stone". The album's lead single, Stuck On U, was released in July 1995, accompanied by a music video filmed in Miami. The single's moderate success paved the way for the second single, U Krazy Katz, which followed in October, and saw a slight change in musical direction for the duo.

The album was released on 3 November 1995, but was a commercial failure, only peaking at number 46 on the UK Albums Chart. Promotion for the album continued with the release of the third single, Perfect, on 20 November, which followed a similar theme to the duo's early hit, "Eternal Love". A promotional tour of Asia and America followed, accompanied by the release of the fifth and final single, Stepping Stone, in March 1996. A deluxe edition of the album was released in Japan on 2 February 1996, containing two bonus tracks, two remixes and a megamix of all the duo's singles. A special Asian edition of the album also includes a bonus club mix of "Stuck on U" plus an acoustic rendition of "Perfect".

Track listing

Charts

Certifications

References

1995 albums
Ant & Dec albums